Franklin Rosborough Thomas (September 5, 1912 – September 8, 2004) was an American animator and pianist. He was one of Walt Disney's leading team of animators known as the Nine Old Men.

Biography 
Thomas was born on September 5, 1912 in Santa Monica, California to Frank Thomas, a teacher, and Ina Gregg. He had two older brothers, Lawrence and Welburne. He grew up in Fresno. Frank Thomas attended Stanford University, where he was a member of Theta Delta Chi fraternity and  worked on campus humor magazine The Stanford Chaparral with Ollie Johnston.  After graduating from Stanford in 1933, he attended Chouinard Art Institute, then joined The Walt Disney Company on September 24, 1934, as employee number 224.  There he animated dozens of feature films and shorts, and also was a member of the Dixieland band Firehouse Five Plus Two, playing the piano.

Career 

His work in animated cartoon shorts included Brave Little Tailor, in which he animated scenes of Mickey Mouse and the king, Mickey and the bear in The Pointer, and German dialogue scenes in the World War II propaganda short Education for Death (shortly before Thomas enlisted in the Army Air Forces). During World War II he was assigned to the First Motion Picture Unit where he made training films.

In feature films, among the characters and scenes Thomas animated were the dwarfs crying over Snow White's "dead" body, Pinocchio singing at the marionette theatre, Bambi and Thumper on the ice, Lady and the Tramp eating spaghetti, the three fairies in Sleeping Beauty, Merlin and Arthur as squirrels and the "wizard's duel" between Merlin and Madam Mim in The Sword in the Stone (in which he was paired with animator Milt Kahl to great effect), King Louie in The Jungle Book (the song number "I Wan'na Be Like You" featuring King Louie and Baloo the Bear re-teamed him with Kahl), the dancing penguins in Mary Poppins, and Winnie The Pooh and Piglet in Winnie the Pooh and the Blustery Day and Winnie the Pooh and Tigger Too. Thomas was directing animator for several memorable villains, including the evil stepmother Lady Tremaine in Cinderella, the Queen of Hearts in Alice in Wonderland, Captain James Hook in Peter Pan, and story consultant in Little Nemo: Adventures in Slumberland.
He retired from Disney on January 31, 1978.  In the 1980s and 1990s, Thomas served on the advisory board of the National Student Film Institute and often was a presenter at the annual film festival's award ceremonies.

Thomas co-authored, with fellow Disney legend Ollie Johnston, the comprehensive book Disney Animation: The Illusion of Life, first published by Abbeville Press in 1981.  Regarded as the definitive resource book on traditional hand-drawn character animation (particularly in the Disney style), the book has been republished numerous times, and is widely considered "the bible" among character animators. The book summarized the Disney approach to animation through the so-called 12 basic principles of animation.

Thomas and Johnston were also profiled in the 1995 documentary Frank and Ollie, which screened at the 20th Toronto International Film Festival, directed by Thomas's son Theodore Thomas. The film profiled their careers, private lives, and the personal friendship between the two men. In 2012, Theodore Thomas also directed another short documentary, "Growing up with Nine Old Men", included in the Diamond edition of Disney's Peter Pan DVD.

Thomas's last work in an animated film before his death was for The Incredibles (directed by Brad Bird), although he voiced a character, rather than animating one. Frank and his friend and colleague Ollie Johnston voiced and were caricatured as two old men saying "That's old school ..." "Yeah, no school like the old school." The pair had previously been heard, and caricatured, as the two train engineers in Bird's The Iron Giant. Thomas died in La Cañada Flintridge, California on September 8, 2004, three days after his 92nd birthday. His widow, Jeanette A. Thomas, died on September 29, 2012.

The 2001 biography Walt Disney's Nine Old Men & The Art of Animation by John Canemaker chronicles Thomas' life.

On the Animation Podcast, Disney director John Musker discussed Frank Thomas, and mentioned that at one time, fellow animation great Chuck Jones had christened Thomas the "Laurence Olivier of animators."

Filmography

Films

Television series

Books (all with Johnston) 

 Disney Animation: The Illusion of Life
 Too Funny For Words: Disney's Greatest Sight Gags
 The Disney Villain
 Bambi: The Story and the Film, accompanied by a flip book

References

External links 
 
 Frank and Ollie's official site
 Disney Legends
 Camouflage – A Cartoon in Technicolor, World War II animated training film directed by Frank Thomas, via the Internet Archive

1912 births
2004 deaths
Animators from California
Articles containing video clips
Dixieland pianists
Firehouse Five Plus Two members
First Motion Picture Unit personnel
People from Fresno, California
People from La Cañada Flintridge, California
Walt Disney Animation Studios people
Disney Legends